Cyperus granatensis is a species of sedge that is endemic to parts of Colombia.

The species was first formally described by the botanist Charles Baron Clarke in 1908.

See also
 List of Cyperus species

References

granatensis
Taxa named by Charles Baron Clarke
Plants described in 1906
Flora of Colombia